Dana was the brand name of a car built by Hakon Olsen, who had created the Maskinfabriken Dana in Copenhagen, Denmark. The car had a Peugeot air-cooled 6 hp engine and was built between 1908 and 1914 with minor modifications. The end of its (limited) production has been attributed to different company priorities after the outbreak of World War I.

References
 oldtimerservice Dana car
 allcarindex.com Dana car

Vehicles of Denmark
Cyclecars